The first USS Moosehead (ID-2047), later the fourth USS Porpoise (YFB-2047), was a steamer that served in the United States Navy from 1918 to 1930.

Origin
Moosehead was built as the commercial steamer SS Moosehead in 1911 by Bath Iron Works at Bath, Maine, Maine. On 13 November 1917, the U.S. Navys 1st Naval District in northern New England inspected her for possible World War I service and, found her acceptable. She was assigned the naval registry identification number 2047 and earmarked for use as a "mine planter" (minelayer). The Navy authorized the Commandant of the 1st Naval District to accept Moosehead with full title from the United States Shipping Board when she was offered for delivery. He was also told that instructions for conversion of Moosehead into a transport for special service would be furnished at some future time.

The Navy acquired Moosehead from her owner, the Maine Central Railroad Company of Portland, Maine, on 28 March 1918. On 11 June 1918, she was slated for operation under the Navy Account by the Naval Overseas Transportation Service (NOTS) in coastwise trade, and the Commandant, 1st Naval District, was authorized to fit her out for that service.  Mooseheads deck logs commenced on 1 July 1918, which may have been the time she entered service; her commissioning date is unclear, but she was commissioned in 1918 as USS Moosehead (ID-2047).

U.S. Navy service

Detached from NOTS and assigned to the United States Atlantic Fleets fleet train on 13 July 1918, Moosehead received orders on 16 July 1918 to proceed to Washington, D.C., to report to the Commandant, Washington Navy Yard, for temporary duty on the ferry route on the Potomac River between Washington and Indian Head, Maryland. On 15 January 1919, the Commandant of the 5th Naval District received word that Moosehead was assigned to duty at the Washington Navy Yard temporarily.

In 1920, Moosehead was reclassified as a ferry, redesignated YFB-2047, and renamed USS Porpoise, becoming the fourth ship of that name. Various dates are given for these events. The U.S. Navy adopted its modern hull number system on 17 July 1920, which would have spurred her redesignation as YFB-2047, but sources state both that she became YFB-2047 on 11 August and on 8 November 1920. Sources also differ on the date of her renaming, offering both 11 August and 8 November 1920 as the date she became Porpoise.

Despite her purportedly temporary assignment there, Porpoise remained assigned to the Washington Navy Yard until stricken from the Navy List on 30 December 1930. She was sold on 24 February 1931.

Notes

References

Naval History and Heritage Center Online Library of Selected Images: U.S. Navy Ships: USS Moosehead (ID # 2047), 1918-1931. Later became USS Porpoise (YFB-2047). It had beenbeen civilian steamship Moosehead (Built 1911)
NavSource Online: Section Patrol Craft Photo Archive Moosehead (ID 2047 Porpoise (YFB 2047)

Auxiliary ships of the United States Navy
World War I auxiliary ships of the United States
World War I cargo ships of the United States
World War I transports of the United States
Ships built in Bath, Maine
1911 ships